William Nesbit (October 11, 1822 – October 26, 1895) was an African American civic leader in Altoona, Pennsylvania and an instrumental lobbyist for the Fourteenth Amendment to the United States Constitution.

Career 

After visiting Liberia in 1853 on the Isla de Cuba, Nesbit became vocally critical of colonizing Liberia. He describes his experiences and observations in colonial Liberia in a pamphlet he wrote in 1855 entitled "Four Months in Liberia, Or, African Colonization Exposed."

Nesbit was active in the Altoona community, serving as a Notary Public and acting as a Blair County, Pennsylvania Republican candidate to the Pennsylvania state convention.

Nesbit served as the first president of The Pennsylvania State Equal Rights League, a chapter of the National Equal Rights League. In this capacity, he successfully lobbied US Congress with congressional allies Charles Sumner, William Kelley and Thaddeus Stevens into passing the Fourteenth Amendment in 1868. He organized a number of National Colored Conventions in Washington, D.C. to rally against "partial or total exclusion of colored citizens of the elective franchise and other citizen rights, in so many States of the Union."

By 1870, he was once again engaged in his original trade as a barber.

Family 

William Nesbit and wife Sarah née Thomas (1815 - 1888) had five children. His son Charles followed in his footsteps and became a local barber.

Nesbit's grandson, Sergeant William C. Nesbit of the 24th Infantry Regiment (United States), participated in the Houston riot of 1917 precipitated by Jim Crow laws and clashes between the Houston, Texas police and the all-black regiment. He was court-martialed and executed.

Death
Nesbit died in 1895 at the age of 73 due to pneumonia.

References

External links 
 Archive.org State Library of Pennsylvania: "Four Months in Liberia, Or, African Colonization Exposed" by William Nesbit
 

1820 births
1895 deaths
African-American people in Pennsylvania politics
History of voting rights in the United States
Activists for African-American civil rights
People from Altoona, Pennsylvania